Another Day is a 2018 album by Musicians David Cross (ex-King Crimson) and David Jackson (ex-Van der Graaf Generator). The two had previously performed together at David Cross Band performances in 2017 (and later in 2019). The personnel of the album also features David Cross Band rhythm section Craig Blundell (drums) and Mick Paul (bass).

Overview 
Before the album, David Jackson had previously guested at David Cross Band concerts (on saxophones, flute and keyboards). They performed some David Cross Band material as well as a few King Crimson classics (including Starless) plus George Martin's Theme One, that was covered by Jackson's Van der Graaf Generator in their early days.

Another Day is a completely different to the previously mentioned concerts, being the result of a collaborative effort of David Cross and David Jackson. This album is more of a Jazz-Rock/Fusion album, compared to the Heavy Prog of the David Cross Band. The most similar to Another Day among Cross' solo albums is probably his first, Memos from Purgatory, from 1989. David Jackson's 1992 solo album Tonewall Stands can also be a relevant reference.

Track listing

Personnel 

 David Cross – electric violin, keyboards
 David Jackson – flute, saxophones, keyboards, sound beams effects
 Mick Paul – bass
 Craig Blundell – drums
 Jake Jackson – production
 Michael Inns – artwork
 John Webber – mastering at Air Studios

References 

2018 albums
Progressive rock albums
Jazz fusion albums
Jazz-rock